The 720th Military Police Battalion is a military police battalion of the United States Army based at Fort Hood, Texas. It is a subordinate unit under the Training and Readiness Authority of the 89th Military Police Brigade. Constituted on 10 January 1942 in the Army as the 720th Military Police Battalion, it was activated during the Second World War at Fort Meade, Maryland on 20 January 1942. The battalion served during that time while stationed in Australia and New Guinea. From there it was relocated to Yokohama, Japan on 2 September 1945 until it finally moved to Fort Hood, Texas on 21 February 1955.

Mission statement
720th Military Police Battalion protects III Corps readiness by conducting Law Enforcement operations to neutralize terrorist and criminal threats at Fort Hood, TX. Additionally, on order, execute detention operations, police operations, and security and mobility support in support of Decisive Action for COCOM (Combatant Commander) requirements.

Organization 
The battalion is subordinate to the 89th Military Police Brigade. It is headquartered at Fort Hood, Texas.

The battalion consists of four military police companies, a law and order detachment, a military working dog detachment and a headquarters and headquarters detachment:
 Headquarters and Headquarters Detachment
 64th Military Police Company
 178th/226th Military Police Detachments
 401st Military Police Company
 410th Military Police Company
 411th Military Police Company

History

World War II 

The 720th Military Police Battalion, "Soldiers of the Gauntlet," was first constituted on 10 January 1942 in the Regular Army as the 720th Military Police Battalion.  It was activated during World II at Fort George G. Meade, Maryland on 20 January 1942.  The Battalion served in three major campaigns during the Second World War while based in Australia and New Guine. At the start of the U. S. occupation of Japan in 1945, the four line companies and headquarters detachment of the 720th Battalion were sent to Tokyo and quartered in the abandoned Japanese espionage school in Nakano.  In 1948, the facility was renamed Camp Burness in memory of a Battalion member who had died in a plane crash near New Guinea during the  War.  Later that year, after a fire destroyed the "B" Company barracks, the Battalion was moved to the former Japanese Imperial Navy Academy in the Tsukiji area of Tokyo. The Battalion relocated to Fort Hood, Texas on 21 February 1955.

Korean War 
In 1950, at the start of the Korean War, the X Corps MP Company (Provisional) was formed when C Company was reflagged, filled their TO&E with volunteers from A and B Company, and sent to Korea where it served with distinction, earning a Meritorious Unit Commendation.

Vietnam War 
From October 1966-August 1972 the battalion served in South Vietnam, III & IV Corps Tactical Zones, subordinate to the 89th MP Group, 18th MP Brigade. They performed convoy escort, POW guard/escort, highway security, physical security, and were the first MP unit in the history of the US Armed Forces to perform a three-year infantry counterinsurgency pacification mission, from 1967-1970. Operation Stabilize included Ambush & Reconnaissance, Village Outpost's, River Patrol. Another MP Corps historical first was to direct air, armor, and infantry support for B Company (AKA Bushwhackers) Ambush Teams defending Long Binh Post during the 23 February Tet 1969 attack. On 13 August 1972 the battalion was sent stateside to Ft Hood, Texas assigned to 5th Army.  Where in 1974 it was assigned the III Corps.

Post-Cold War 
Between 1990 and 1997 Battalion elements deployed to Kuwait for Operation Desert Shield/Storm, in support of Operation Intrinsic Action; Somalia as part of Operation Restore Hope; Honduras and Guantanamo Bay; and  Cuba for Operation Sea Signal, in support of Joint Task Force 160. Elements also deployed to Bosnia-Herzegovina as part of Operation Joint Endeavor/Guard and Joint Forge.

Operation Iraqi Freedom 
The soldiers of the 720th were deployed to Iraq from March 2003 to March 2004, where they operated mainly in Tikrit and Samarra in support of the 4th Infantry Division. They performed many military police missions, including area security, convoy escort, and detainee operations. They also started a program of joint operations with the Iraqi police.

Operation Enduring Freedom 
The 410th Military Police Company deployed to Afghanistan in May 2009 and returned in May 2010. The 401st and 64th Military Police Companies deployed to Afghanistan in May 2010 and returned in April 2011. The 411th Military Police Company deployed to Kandahar Province in May 2011 and returned to Fort Hood in May 2012. HHD, 720th Military Police Battalion deployed in December 2011 and returned in December 2012.

Battalion crest and coat of arms 
The coat of arms was originally approved on 2 May 1952. It was cancelled on 19 July 1973. On 11 August 1999 the coat of arms was reinstated and amended to include a crest. The Distinctive Unit Insignia is a gold color metal and enamel insignia 1 5/32 inches (2.94 cm) in height consisting of a shield blazoned: Vert, a dexter gauntlet in fess Or grasping an imp, head to base, Sable. Attached below the shield a Gold color metal scroll inscribed "ORDERLY REGULATION" in Green enamel letters. The golden restraining hand grasping the inverted black imp, which is symbolical of a petty devil or malignant spirit, is symbolical of the restraining functions of the organization, implying the means by which undesirable factions are kept under control. In the crest, the cross recalls the Cross of Gallantry awarded the unit for outstanding service in Vietnam. The sea-lion refers to the Philippine Presidential Unit Citation awarded for service between 1944 and 1945. The wreath represents honor and achievement. The drawn swords denote readiness and recall the many campaigns in which the 720th Military Police Battalion has distinguished itself. Black signifies strength and resolve. Gold symbolizes excellence, and with green represents the Military Police branch. The motto "ORDERLY REGULATION" is expressive of the determination of the personnel to regulate with order, and alludes to the charges on the shield.

Honors

Unit decorations

Campaign streamers

References

External links 
 Military Police reunion webpage
 720th Military Police Battalion Fort Hood website

720
Military units and formations in Texas